France has a rich selection of gold and silver commemorative coins.  These coins are minted by Monnaie de Paris, which is a state owned industrial and commercial company.

Gold

€5

€10

€20

€50

Silver

€0.25

€1.50

€5

€15

€20

€50

Notes

References

 

France
Coins of France
2007 in France